Cassano Spinola is a comune (municipality) in the Province of Alessandria in the Italian region Piedmont, located about  southeast of Turin and about  southeast of Alessandria. 

Cassano Spinola borders the following municipalities: Carezzano, Novi Ligure, Pozzolo Formigaro, Sant'Agata Fossili, Sardigliano, Serravalle Scrivia, Stazzano, and Villalvernia.

References

Cities and towns in Piedmont